RSS Steadfast (70) is the third ship of the Formidable-class stealth frigate of the Republic of Singapore Navy.

Construction and career 
RSS Steadfast was built by ST Marine Engineering company in Singapore around the late 2000s. Steadfast was commissioned on 5 February 2008.

RIMPAC 2008 
Between 27 June to 31 July 2008, RSS Steadfast participated in the exercise alongside more than 30+ warships and 10+ submarines from different countries. The exercise took place off Hawaii in the Pacific Ocean.

CARAT 2010 
RSS Vigilance, RSS Steadfast, RSS Persistence, MV Avatar, USNS Amelia Earhart, USS Russell, USS Chung-Hoon and USCGC Mellon participated in CARAT 2010.

RIMPAC 2016 
RSS Steadfast was leading two multi-national warship from Okinawa to Hawaii for RIMPAC 2016 which lasts from 30 June to 4 August 2016.

On 27 May 2020, RSS Steadfast and USS Gabrielle Giffords conducted a bilateral exercise from 24 to 25 May in the South China Sea.

Gallery

References 

Ships of the Republic of Singapore Navy
2005 ships
Formidable-class frigates
Republic of Singapore Navy